Phrynobatrachus brevipalmatus is a species of frog in the family Phrynobatrachidae.
It is endemic to Angola.
Its natural habitats are freshwater marshes and intermittent freshwater marshes.

References

brevipalmatus
Endemic fauna of Angola
Amphibians described in 1925
Taxonomy articles created by Polbot